Charles Luke may refer to:

Charles Luke (politician) (1857–1941), mayor of Wellington, New Zealand
Charles A. Luke (born 1961), American educator, author, nonprofit leader and consultant
Charles Luke (Australian footballer) (1915–1998), Footscray VFL footballer
Charles Luke (English footballer) (1909–1983), Huddersfield Town association footballer
Harry Charles Luke (1884–1969), Governor of Fiji

See also

Charlie Luke (disambiguation)